Presidential elections were held in Moldova on 17 November 1996, with a second round on 1 December. Whilst incumbent President Mircea Snegur received the most votes in the first round, he was defeated in the second by Petru Lucinschi.

Results

References

Moldova
1996 elections in Moldova
1996 in Moldova
Presidential elections in Moldova